Kramgoa låtar 2011 is a studio album by Christer Sjögren, released on 22 June 2011.

Track listing
Mötet
Natten tänder sina ljus
Det skrivs så många vackra ord
A Violin That Never Has Been Played
Meet Me in Heaven
Barndomsåren
Tack	
Livet det har varit gott mot mej
Jag vill alltid ha dej som du är
Om du var min
Blue Bayou
Halvvägs till himlen
Jag vill andas samma luft som du
Ditt hjärtas röst

Charts

Weekly charts

Year-end charts

References 

2011 albums
Christer Sjögren albums